Francisco Javier "Javi" García Fernández (born 8 February 1987) is a Spanish former professional footballer who is an assistant manager for Benfica. A defensive midfielder by nature, he could also appear as a central defender.

He started his career with Real Madrid, but represented mostly the reserve team, going on to have a three-year spell with Benfica in Portugal. In 2012 he signed with Manchester City, then spent a further three seasons in the Russian Premier League with Zenit where he appeared in 108 matches across all competitions. He returned to Spain with Betis in 2017 and retired at Boavista.

García represented Spain at various youth levels, including the victorious under-19s at the 2006 European Championship, and made his senior international debut in 2012.

Club career

Real Madrid
A product of Real Madrid's youth system, García was born in Mula, Region of Murcia, and played three La Liga matches for the first team while still a junior, making his debut at age 17 in a 5–0 home win against Levante UD on 28 November 2004. After that, he would spend the entire 2005–06 season with the reserves in Segunda División.

The summer of 2006 was a very busy one for García: first, he won the UEFA European Championship with the under-19s, impressing first-team head coach Fabio Capello who recalled him to training sessions. He played most of Real's pre-season games, including a starting line-up spot in both Ramón de Carranza Trophy fixtures, being deployed in central midfield alongside new purchase Emerson; however, he failed to appear for the main squad in official matches.

In August 2007, in the campaign of García's supposed definitive promotion to the first team, head coach Bernd Schuster would eventually prevent that golden opportunity – as fellow cantera players Rubén de la Red and Esteban Granero also left – and offers began to appear from clubs in the Premier League, including Liverpool, and domestic teams such as Atlético Madrid and Deportivo de La Coruña. García would finally settle for CA Osasuna on 31 August, signing for four seasons for a €2.5 million transfer fee as the Navarre side was keen to replace injury-struck midfielder Javad Nekounam (out of action for several months); having first appeared in a 1–1 home draw to Sevilla FC, where he played one minute, he scored twice in his first six matches, in victories over Levante (4–1) and Villarreal CF (3–2).

García's contract included a buy-back clause that could see him return to Real Madrid for €4 million. On 29 April 2008, Osasuna officially reported that the former had exercised their purchase option, and the player returned to the Santiago Bernabéu for 2008–09; he made his first league appearance for Real in his second spell during the 7–1 thrashing of Sporting de Gijón on 24 September, coming on as a second-half substitute for Mahamadou Diarra.

Benfica

Deemed surplus to requirements at Real Madrid, García signed for S.L. Benfica in Portugal on 21 July 2009 on a five-year contract for a €7 million transfer fee. An undisputed starter throughout his first season he also scored three goals, most notably through a header in the last minute for the game's only goal against Associação Naval 1º de Maio at home, as the club clung onto the top position on 9 November and eventually won the Primeira Liga.

García made 43 competitive appearances in 2011–12. His two goals of the campaign came against Sporting CP in the Lisbon derby 1–0 home win, and at Chelsea in the quarter-finals of the UEFA Champions League – in the latter, he netted off a corner kick in the 85th minute to make it 1–1, but ten-men Benfica eventually lost 1–2 and 1–3 on aggregate.

Manchester City
On 31 August 2012, García joined Manchester City for £15.8 million. He made his Premier League debut on 15 September in a 1–1 away draw to Stoke City, scoring with a header from a Carlos Tevez free-kick.

After picking up a thigh injury in the early minutes of the Champions League group stage fixture against Borussia Dortmund, García missed several weeks of action. He made his return against West Ham United, replacing Tevez in the 84th minute of a 0–0 draw at Upton Park. On 15 December, he started in a 3–1 victory at Newcastle United and scored his side's second goal.

Zenit Saint Petersburg
On 13 August 2014, FC Zenit Saint Petersburg announced the £13 million signing of García after he passed the medical and agreed to personal terms. He scored his first goal for his new team 18 days later, the only in an away win over FC Lokomotiv Moscow in the Russian Premier League.

García played 24 matches in the 2014–15 season, scoring three times as the side won the fifth national championship in their history (fourth under the tournament's new denomination).

Betis
On 14 August 2017, the 30-year-old García returned to Spain after eight years to join Real Betis. He appeared in 64 total games for the team from the Estadio Benito Villamarín over three seasons, scoring once in a 3–1 away win against Deportivo Alavés on 12 March 2018 and being sent off the following 10 February in a 3–0 loss at CD Leganés.

García signed a new two-year contract with the Andalusians on 5 July 2019.

Boavista
After mutually terminating his contract with Betis, García went back to Portugal's top flight by joining Boavista F.C. on a three-year deal on 19 August 2020. He scored his first goal for the team on 25 October in a 2–2 draw at F.C. Famalicão, in which he was sent off.

On 22 June 2022, 35-year-old García retired. Remaining in Portugal, he immediately went back to Benfica and joined the staff of new manager Roger Schmidt.

International career
García represented the Spain national under-21 team at the 2009 UEFA European Championship, appearing against England (2–0 loss) in an eventual group stage exit. He earned his first cap for the full side on 26 May 2012, playing 22 minutes in a 2–0 friendly win over Serbia in St. Gallen.

Career statistics

Club

Honours
Real Madrid B
Segunda División B: 2004–05

Real Madrid
Supercopa de España: 2008

Benfica
Primeira Liga: 2009–10
Taça da Liga: 2009–10, 2010–11, 2011–12

Manchester City
Premier League: 2013–14
Football League Cup: 2013–14
FA Cup runner-up: 2012–13

Zenit Saint Petersburg
Russian Premier League: 2014–15
Russian Cup: 2015–16
Russian Super Cup: 2015, 2016

Spain U19
UEFA European Under-19 Championship: 2006

References

External links

 
 
 
 
 
 

1987 births
Living people
People from Río Mula
Spanish footballers
Footballers from the Region of Murcia
Association football defenders
Association football midfielders
Association football utility players
La Liga players
Segunda División players
Segunda División B players
Real Madrid Castilla footballers
Real Madrid CF players
CA Osasuna players
Real Betis players
Primeira Liga players
S.L. Benfica footballers
Boavista F.C. players
Premier League players
Manchester City F.C. players
Russian Premier League players
FC Zenit Saint Petersburg players
Spain youth international footballers
Spain under-21 international footballers
Spain international footballers
Spanish expatriate footballers
Expatriate footballers in Portugal
Expatriate footballers in England
Expatriate footballers in Russia
Spanish expatriate sportspeople in Portugal
Spanish expatriate sportspeople in England
Spanish expatriate sportspeople in Russia
S.L. Benfica non-playing staff